Axel Maersk (or Axel Mærsk) is a Danish container ship and part of the fleet of the Maersk Line.

Design
The container ship Axel Maersk was built in 2003 in the ship-yard of the Maersk Line in Odense, Denmark. The flag of Axel Maersk is also in Denmark. Axel Maersk was ordered in 2002 and completed in the beginning of 2003. The MMSI of the ship is 220187000, the IMO number is 9260419 and the call sign is OUUY2. The deadweight of the ship is 109,000 metric tons with a gross tonnage of 93,496.

The ship has a capacity of more than 9,000 TEUs.

References 

Container ships
Merchant ships of Denmark
Ships of the Maersk Line
2003 ships